Michael McCarthy (born 10 October 1957) is a former Australian rules footballer who played with Hawthorn and the Brisbane Bears in the Victorian Football League (VFL).

McCarthy played most of his football across half back but could also play up forward when required. He was a premiership player with Hawthorn in 1978 and 1983.

In 1987 he joined Brisbane for their inaugural VFL season and played with the club for two years. He is currently a teacher at Brighton Grammar School, teaching Physical Education and Health education.

References

1957 births
Living people
Hawthorn Football Club players
Hawthorn Football Club Premiership players
Brisbane Bears players
Australian rules footballers from Victoria (Australia)
Two-time VFL/AFL Premiership players